Gunther S. Stent (28 March 1924 – 12 June 2008) was Graduate Professor of Molecular Biology at the University of California, Berkeley. One of the early bacteriophage biologists, he was known also for his studies on the metabolism of bacteria  and neurobiology of  leeches, and for his writing on the history and philosophy of biology.

Early life and early career
He was born Günter Siegmund Stensch in Berlin. His surname was changed following his emigration to the US in 1940, where he went to live in Chicago. He received his BS (1945) and PhD (1948) from the University of Illinois.

In 1949, Gunther Stent joined the small group of phage workers under Max Delbrück at the California Institute of Technology in Pasadena, California.  This phage group was the incubator for many of the fundamental ideas of the newly emerging science of molecular biology.  Informal discussions among these workers on the progress of their research led  to a book by Stent entitled "Molecular Biology of Bacterial Viruses" (dedicated to Max Delbrück) which was a lucid account of the state of accomplishments in the field up to 1963.  Later, in his memoirs,  Stent described some of his activities and interactions with others of the group.  These personal memories illustrated the unique intellectual spirit of the phage group during its early crucial years (1948–1950).

Overview
His introductory textbook, Molecular Genetics; an Introductory Narrative has been translated into Italian, Japanese, Russian, and Spanish.

He was perhaps most generally known for his  works on the progress of science, especially his 1969 lectures at Berkeley published as  The Coming of the Golden Age.

Stent lectured in the molecular biology portion of Biology 1 at UC Berkeley.  He had a very unusual lecture style; he introduced the major experiments that advanced the field of molecular biology in chronological order. It provided students with a unique understanding of molecular biology and experimentation.

Stent was at Oxford in 1953 when Watson and Crick made their announcement that they had "discovered the secret of life."  Watson's book "The Double Helix" includes a picture of Stent with Watson and Crick.

Stent was a member of the American Academy of Arts and Sciences, the United States National Academy of Sciences, and the American Philosophical Society.

Religious views 
When asked "Do you believe in God?" Stent stated: "I don't know whether I do, even though I believe that I as a scientist ought to. But, by way of a paradox, I do believe, as Planck did, that all scientists have to believe in Him."

Publications

Books on Molecular biology 
Stent, G. S. (1998). Nazis, Women, and Molecular Biology: Memoirs of a Lucky Self-hater. Kensington, Calif: Briones Books.
Muller, K. J., Nicholls, J. G., & Stent, G. S. (1981). Neurobiology of the Leech. Cold Spring Harbor, N.Y.: Cold Spring Harbor Laboratory.
Stent, G. S. (1971). Molecular Genetics; an Introductory Narrative. San Francisco: W.H. Freeman.
Italian translation: Stent, G. S., & Stent, G. S. (1977). Genetica molecolare. Bologna, Italy: Zanichelli.
Russian translation: Stent, G. S., Calendar, R., & Stent, G. S. (1981). Molekuli︠a︡rnai︠a︡ genetika. Moskva: Izd-vo MIR.
Spanish translation: Stent, G. S. (1981). Genética molecular. Barcelona: Omega.
Japanese translation: Stent, G. S., Calendar, R., & Nagano, K. (1983). 分子遺伝学.  Bunshi idengaku 岩波書店.
Stent, G. S. 1963. Molecular Biology of Bacterial Viruses. WH Freeman and Co., San Francisco, CA. OCLC 268815

Books edited
John Cairns, G. Stent, and  J. D. Watson, eds. 2007. Phage and the Origins of Molecular Biology (40th anniversary edition). Cold Spring Harbor Laboratory Press, Cold Spring Harbor, NY, 
Cairns, J., G. Stent, and J. D. Watson. 1992. Phage and the Origins of Molecular Biology (expanded edition). Cold Spring Harbor Laboratory Press, Cold Spring Harbor, NY. OCLC 25872929
Cairns, J., G. Stent, and J. D. Watson. 1966. Phage and the Origins of Molecular Biology. Cold Spring Harbor Laboratory Press, Cold Spring Harbor, NY. OCLC 712215
German translation: Cairns, J., Geissler, E., Stent, G. S., Thomas-Petersein, G., & Watson, J. D. (1972). Phagen und die Entwicklung der Molekularbiologie (Phages and the origins of molecular biology, [German].) Hrsg. v. John Cairns.
Watson, J. D., & Stent, G. S. (1980). The Double Helix: a Personal Account of the Discovery of the Structure of DNA. New York: Norton.
Stent, G. S. (1978). Morality as a biological phenomenon:  report of the Dahlem Workshop on Biology and Morals, Berlin 1977, November 28 to December 2. Life Sciences Research Report, 9. Berlin: Dahlem Konferenzen.

Books on Philosophy of science
Stent, G. S. (2002). 'Paradoxes of free will'. Transactions of the American Philosophical Society, v. 92, pt. 6. Philadelphia: American Philosophical Society.
Delbrück, M., & Stent, G. S. (1986). Mind from matter? an essay on evolutionary epistemology. Palo Alto, Calif: Blackwell Scientific Publications.		
German translation: Delbrück, M., Fischer, E. P., & Stent, G. S. (1986). Wahrheit und Wirklichkeit über die Evolution des Erkennens. Hamburg: Rasch und Röhring Verlag.
Spanish translation: Delbrück, M., Stent, S. G., & Casadesús, J. (1989). Mente y materia ensayo de epistemología evolutiva. Alianza Universidad, 616. Madrid: Alianza.
Stent, G. S., & Ogawa, M. (1981).  真理>と悟り : 科学の形而上学と東洋哲学  Shinri to satori kagaku no keijijōgaku to tōyō tetsugaku.   朝日出版社,  Tōkyō: Asahishuppansha.
Stent, G. S. (1980). Morality as a biological phenomenon the pre-suppositions of sociobiological research. Berkeley: University of California Press.
Stent, G. S. (1978). Paradoxes of progress. San Francisco: W.H. Freeman.
Spanish translation: Stent, G. S. (1986). Las paradojas del progreso. Barcelona: Salvat.
Stent, G. S. (1969). The coming of the Golden Age; a view of the end of progress. Garden City, N.Y.: Published for the American Museum of Natural History [by] the Natural History Press.
French translation: Stent, G. S., & Bourdet, C. (1973). L'Avènement de l'âge d'or. L'humanité au carrefour de son évolution [Paris]: Fayard.

References

Further reading
 Elvee, R. Q. (1992). The end of science? attack and defense. Lanham, Md: University Press of America.

External links
 Guide to the Gunther S. Stent Papers at The Bancroft Library
 berkeley.edu
 Samuel H. Barondes, "Gunther S. Stent", Biographical Memoirs of the National Academy of Sciences (2011)

Philosophers of science
Phage workers
German emigrants to the United States
University of California, Berkeley faculty
1924 births
2008 deaths
Members of the United States National Academy of Sciences
Members of the American Philosophical Society